The Fonds national d'art contemporain (FNAC; National Foundation for Contemporary Art) is a public collection of contemporary art in France. It does not hold exhibitions but acquires and stores works of art that it loans to museums, cultural institutions and temporary exhibitions in France and abroad. It is the largest collection of contemporary art in France.

Collection

FNAC is little-known, but is the largest collection of living art in France.
As of 2014 it had 70,000 works of visual art, photography, decorative art and design.
The FNAC has its origins in the Bureau des travaux d'art (Office of Art Works) created in 1878, which became the FNAC in 1976.
In 1981 it became the responsibility of the Délégation aux arts plastiques of the French Ministry of Culture.
It supports creation of art through acquisition of the work of living artists, and disseminates the work.
As well as purchasing work by established artists, it tries to discover new creations of young artists.
The FNAC adapts to contemporary trends and is open to diverse artistic approaches.

FNAC stores its collection in a  facility under the Esplanade de la Défense.
The Centre national des arts plastiques (CNAP) manages the collection.
Information on the collection is maintained by Videomuseum.
FNAC does not exhibit the works, which are meant to be placed on deposit or loaned to museums and cultural institutions, or loaned to exhibitions in France and abroad.
Every year almost 2,000 items are loaned for temporary displays in France or abroad, including thematic exhibitions, solo exhibitions, retrospectives and so on.
The FNAC takes care of packaging, transportation, ensuring a suitable environment in the place of exhibition, and restoration.

Acquisition process

Between 1981 and 2014 about 9,000 works by 3,500 different artists have been acquired by the FNAC.
FNAC buys 600 to 1,000 new works each year.
Purchasing recommendations are made by a commission of members of the arts community, including critics, collectors, artists, and representatives from the Ministry of Culture.
The commission meets several times each year to review requests for acquisitions made by artists or galleries.
Artists must not have sold their work to the state for two years, and only one nomination is allowed every two years unless specifically requested by the commission. The works are acquired by specialized committees for visual arts, photography, decorative art and design.
Members are appointed by the Minister of Culture for three-year terms.

References

Sources

1878 establishments in France
Art museums and galleries in France
Art museums established in 1878
La Défense